In Greek mythology, Methone (Ancient Greek: Μεθώνη) was the name shared by the three women:

 Methone, one of the Alcyonides, daughters of the giant Alcyoneus. She was the sister of Alkippe, Anthe, Asteria, Drimo, Pallene and Phthonia (Phosthonia or Chthonia). When their father Alcyoneus was slain by Heracles, these girls threw themselves into the sea from Kanastraion, which is the peak of Pellene. They were then transformed into halcyons (kingfishers) by the goddess Amphitrite.
 Methone, the nymph-consort of Pierus, king of Pieria, and by the latter, became the mother of Oeagrus, father of Orpheus. In some accounts rather, she was called the sister of Pierus.
 Methone or Mothone (Μοθώνη), a bastard daughter of King Oeneus of Calydon by a concubine. She was the eponymous heroine who gave her name to Methone in Messenia.
Methone, wife of King Poeas of Meliboea and mother of Philoctetes. Otherwise, the latter's mother was called Demonassa. This Methone may be the same as the above character.

Notes

References 

 John Tzetzes, Book of Histories, Book V-VI translated by Konstantinos Ramiotis from the original Greek of T. Kiessling's edition of 1826.  Online version at theio.com.
 Pausanias, Description of Greece with an English Translation by W.H.S. Jones, Litt.D., and H.A. Ormerod, M.A., in 4 Volumes. Cambridge, MA, Harvard University Press; London, William Heinemann Ltd. 1918. . Online version at the Perseus Digital Library
 Pausanias, Graeciae Descriptio. 3 vols. Leipzig, Teubner. 1903.  Greek text available at the Perseus Digital Library.
 Suida, Suda Encyclopedia translated by Ross Scaife, David Whitehead, William Hutton, Catharine Roth, Jennifer Benedict, Gregory Hays, Malcolm Heath Sean M. Redmond, Nicholas Fincher, Patrick Rourke, Elizabeth Vandiver, Raphael Finkel, Frederick Williams, Carl Widstrand, Robert Dyer, Joseph L. Rife, Oliver Phillips and many others. Online version at the Topos Text Project.

 Nymphs
Mythological Thracian women
Greek mythology of Thrace